The Madagascar spiny forests (also known as the Madagascar spiny thickets) is an ecoregion in the southwest of Madagascar. The vegetation type is found on poor substrates with low, erratic winter rainfall. The ecoregion contains an outstanding proportion of endemic plant species and is listed as one of the 200 most important ecological regions in the world; one of the Global 200.

Flora
This is the area with the highest level of plant endemism in Madagascar, with 48% of the genera and 95% of the species endemic. Many constituent plants show extreme adaptations to drought. Spiny plants of the endemic subfamily Didiereoideae form a conspicuous component, especially towards the east. They are woody but distantly related to the cacti; on the mainland of the African continent, this subfamily is very closely related to the species Portulacaria afra, also known as the elephant bush due to the many animals (and humans) that consume the succulent, vitamin C-rich, lemony leaves. By comparison, on Madagascar, the lemurs and other wildlife regularly eat the leaves of the Didiereoid Alluaudia procera, a prevalent species of the spiny forests. Its wood is also used by local people for building, while the thorny stalks are utilized for security and fencing purposes. The remaining components of the forest are dominated by members of the plant families Apocynaceae (of the genus Pachypodium), Burseraceae, Euphorbiaceae, Anacardiaceae and Fabaceae, all of which have representatives elsewhere.

Fauna
Notable inhabitants of the spiny thickets include the spider tortoise (Pyxis arachnoides) and the radiated tortoise (Astrochelys radiata), the gecko Ebenavia maintimainty, several lemurs including Verreaux's sifaka, Grandidier's mongoose, and eight endemic birds.

Conservation
8.31% of the ecoregion is in protected areas. including Tsimanampetsotsa National Park, Berenty Reserve, Beza Mahafaly Reserve, and Cap Sainte Marie Special Reserve. Andohahela National Park offers limited protection through its 'parcel 3' section. Elsewhere the spiny forest habitat is under pressure from human exploitation. The main impacting activities are burning for conversion to grazing land, harvesting for charcoal and firewood, and logging for construction. The Arboretum d'Antsokay is a botanical garden near Toliara dedicated to preserving the flora of the spiny forest.

Gallery

As shown on the map on the right, Madagascar can be divided into four climatic ecoregions with four forest types: the moist forest in the East (green), the dry forest in the West (orange), the spiny forest in the South (red), and the mangrove forest on the West coast (blue). Ecoregions were defined following climatic and vegetation criteria. The dark grey areas represent the remaining natural forest cover for the year 2014. Forest types are defined on the basis of their belonging to one of the four ecoregions.

See also
 Ecoregions of Madagascar
 Flora of Madagascar
 Moringa (genus)
 Sakoa

References

External links and bibliography

 For extent, fragmentation and intact sections, see: A refined classification of the primary vegetation of Madagascar based on the underlying geology, Du Puy and Moat, 1996.
 For dominant plant families, see: Structure and floristic composition of the vegetation in the Réserve Naturelle Intégrale d’Andohahela, Madagascar, Rakotomalaza and Messmer, 1999.

Madagascar spiny thickets (Encyclopedia of the Earth)

 
Deserts and xeric shrublands
Ecoregions of Madagascar
Atsimo-Andrefana
Anosy
 Androy